Wes Bound is an album by American jazz guitarist Lee Ritenour that was released in 1993 by GRP Records.  The album comprises a mix of cover versions of original songs by famed jazz electric guitarist Wes Montgomery and Lee Ritenour originals in similar style, with a stellar cast of supporting musicians and studio technicians.  Some years after its original release, it was reissued (in limited numbers) with the benefits of 20 Bit digital remastering, which many consider transformed it from merely good to a truly great album.  'Wes Bound' received a Grammy Award nomination for Best Jazz Instrumental Performance, Individual or Group and reached No. 1 on the Billboard magazine Contemporary Jazz chart.

Track listing

Personnel
 Lee Ritenour – guitars
 John Beasley – keyboards
 Bob James – keyboards
 Alan Broadbent – piano 
 Melvin Lee Davis – bass
 Harvey Mason – drums
 Gary Novak – drums
 Maxi Priest – guest artist, vocals
 Cassio Duarte – percussion

Charts

References

External links
Wes Bound at AllMusic
Lee Ritenour's Official Site

1993 albums
GRP Records albums
Lee Ritenour albums